The name Gosnells may refer to:

Places 
 City of Gosnells, a local government area in Western Australia

Other uses 
 Electoral district of Gosnells, represented in the Western Australian Legislative Assembly
 Gosnells railway station, Perth, located on the Armadale railway line

See also 
 Gosnell (disambiguation)
 List of mayors of Gosnells